HD 182509, also designated as HR 7370, is an orange hued star located in the southern constellation Telescopium. It has an apparent magnitude of 5.69, making it faintly visible to the naked eye if viewed under ideal conditions. Parallax measurements place the object at a distance of 635 light years.

HD 182509 has a stellar classification of K4 III, indicating that it is a red giant. Gaia DR3 stellar evolution models place it on the red giant branch. It has 1.12 times the mass of the Sun but has expanded to 32.6 times its girth. HD 182509 iron abundance is 95% that of the Sun, placing it at solar metallicity.

Eggleton and Tokovonin (2008) list the pair as a binary star. However, its parallax and proper motion indicate that it is instead a foreground object. Components C and D are instead faint optical background objects, while the E component is probably non-existent.

References

K-type giants
Telescopium (constellation)
182509
CD-54 08308
095690
7370
Telescopii, 59
Multiple stars